Association for Advancement & Rehabilitation of Handicapped (abbr.: AAROH)  is an Indian charitable society founded in 1983 by a few committed citizens and affected parents of disabled children.

History
Air Vice Marshal SC Gupta founded AAROH in 1983 and functioned as secretary AAROH until his untimely demise in 2004. Mrs. Asha Gupta co-founded AAROH/Navjyoti together with AVM SC Gupta in 1983.

References

External links
 

Organizations established in 1983
Organisations based in Delhi
Charities based in India
Disability organisations based in India
1983 establishments in Delhi